This is a list of breweries and brew pubs in the U.S. state of Rhode Island.

Breweries
Apponaug Brewing Company - Warwick
Coastal Extreme Brewing Company, which uses the Newport Storm label - Newport
Crooked Current Brewery - Pawtucket
Foolproof Brewing Company - Pawtucket
Grey Sail Brewing of Rhode Island - Westerly
Narragansett Brewing Company - Pawtucket
Moniker Brewery - Providence, Rhode Island
Proclamation Ale Company - Warwick
 Providence Brewing Company – Providence. Established 1814; revived 2016
 Ravenous Brewing Company - Woonsocket
Rejects Beer Company - Middletown
Revival Brewing Company - Providence
Shaidzon Beer Company – West Kingston
 Smug Brewing Company - Pawtucket
Tilted Barn Brewery - Exeter
Whalers Brewing Company - Wakefield

Breweries (defunct)
American Brewing Company – Providence, operated from 1892–1922.
Bucket Brewery – Pawtucket

Brewpubs 

Coddington Brewing Company – Middletown
Long Live Beerworks - Providence, Rhode Island since 2019, located in the former Mechanical Fabric Company
Trinity Brewhouse - Providence

See also 
 Beer in the United States
 List of breweries in the United States
 List of microbreweries

References

Rhode Island
Rhode Island culture
Breweries